The 2018 Oceania Rugby Women's Championship was the second edition of the competition. It was held in Churchill Park, Lautoka, Fiji from 16 - 24 November. Samoa and Tonga joined the competition this year. Fiji successfully defended their Oceania Championship title defeating Samoa 43–12.

Tournament

Table

Match results 
Round 1

Round 2

Round 3

References 

2018 in women's rugby union
2018 in Oceanian rugby union
2018 in Fijian sport
Oceania Rugby Women's Championship